The 1906 Norwegian Football Cup was the fifth season of the Norwegian annual knockout football tournament. The tournament was open for 1906 local association leagues (kretsserier) champions, except in Kristiania og omegn where a separate cup qualifying tournament was held. Odd won their fourth consecutive title. This was the first final attended by the Norwegian majesties.

Semi-finals

|colspan="3" style="background-color:#97DEFF"|8 September 1906

|}

Final

References

External links
RSSSF Football Archive

Norwegian Football Cup seasons
Norway
Football Cup